Sancti Spíritus Airport  is an airport serving Sancti Spíritus, the capital city of the Sancti Spíritus Province in Cuba.

Facilities

References

External links
 

Airports in Cuba
Buildings and structures in Sancti Spíritus